This Zhuyin table is a complete listing of all Zhuyin (Bopomofo) syllables used in the Republic of China (Taiwan) as auxiliary to Chinese language studies while in Mainland China an adaptation of the Latin alphabet is used to represent Chinese phonemes in the Pinyin system. Each syllable in a cell is composed of an initial (columns) and a final (rows). An empty cell indicates that the corresponding syllable does not exist in Standard Chinese.

The ,  and  groupings indicate a combination of those finals with finals from Group ㄚ.

This table indicates possible combinations of initials and finals in Standard Chinese, but does not indicate tones, which are equally important to the proper pronunciation.  Although some initial-final combinations have some syllables using each of the 5 different tones, most do not. Some utilise only one tone.

Equivalent Hanyu Pinyin initials and finals are listed next to their respective bopomofo initial and final. Bopomofo entries in this page can also be compared to syllables using the romanised Pinyin phonetic system in the Pinyin table page.

There are differences between what syllables are listed in bopomofo tables and those that are listed in some pinyin tables, due to the standardisation differences of a few characters between the mainland standard Putonghua and the Taiwanese standard Guoyu. For example, the variant sounds  (ruá),  (dèn),  (tēi) are not used in the Taiwanese standard. Likewise the variant sound  (lüán) is not recognized in Putonghua, or it is folded into (luán).

Note that the zhuyin  directly maps to Pinyin ü, except for the combination  where it maps to Pinyin iong.

See also
Bopomofo
Pinyin table
Wade–Giles table
Palladius table
 Katakana
 Hiragana

References

 

Mandarin words and phrases
Transcription of Chinese